León Villar (born September 25, 1969) was a Spanish judoka. He competed at the 1992 Summer Olympics and the 1996 Summer Olympics.

Achievements

References

External links

1969 births
Living people
Spanish male judoka
Judoka at the 1992 Summer Olympics
Judoka at the 1996 Summer Olympics
Olympic judoka of Spain
20th-century Spanish people
21st-century Spanish people